Yichun Confucian Temple is a Confucian temple located in Yichun, Jiangxi, China.

History
Found in 1143 in the reign of Emperor Gaozong of Song by the local government, it was enlarged, burned, and rededicated several times. The last restoration was in 1934. In history, it had over ten halls and rooms, such as the Gate, Pond, Hall of Minglun, Pavilion of Zunjing, Palace of Wenchang, and Pavilion of Kuixing.

Architecture
The extant building only the Hall of Dacheng. The Hall of Dacheng in it has double-eave gable and hip roofs covered with yellow glazed tiles, which symbolize a high level in architecture.

References

Confucian temples in China
Buildings and structures in Yichun, Jiangxi
Tourist attractions in Yichun, Jiangxi
1143 establishments in Asia
Religious buildings and structures completed in 1143
12th-century Confucian temples
12th-century establishments in China